The Dames Point Bridge (officially the Napoleon Bonaparte Broward Bridge) is a cable-stayed bridge over the St. Johns River in Jacksonville, Florida on the Interstate 295 East Beltway. Construction began in 1985 and was completed in 1989. The bridge was designed by HNTB Corporation and RS&H, Inc. The Massman Construction Company built the bridge.

Design
The bridge's cables are arranged on multiple vertical planes in a slight modification to the harp (parallel) stay arrangement.   Main span cables are paired to anchor into the tower in a vertical plane while side span cables pair up to anchor in a horizontal plane such that four cables anchor in each tower at approximately the same elevation.

Superlatives
Until the 2003 completion of the Sidney Lanier Bridge in Brunswick, Georgia,  the Dames Point Bridge was the only bridge in the United States to feature the harp stay arrangement.

Gallery

Accident
On May 15, 1989, while inspectors were checking the bridge for cracks and fissures, the boom arm holding a bucket snapped, leaving the bucket tilted on its side. One worker fell into the river below and the others were at risk of plummeting 145 feet down. The man in the river suffered a dislocated shoulder but was able to swim to safety. Rescuers rappelled down the side of the bridge to the other three workers and successfully brought them all to safety. The story of this rescue effort was aired on Rescue 911 on September 12 of the same year.

See also
 
 
 
 List of crossings of the St. Johns River

References

External links

Dames Point Bridge on Google Street View
Mike Strong's Dames Point Bridge site
The bridge on Rescue 9-1-1
John Weeks Dames Point Bridge
Dames Point Bridge - Bridgehunters.com

Bridges completed in 1989
Bridges in Jacksonville, Florida
Cable-stayed bridges in the United States
Interstate 95
Landmarks in Florida
Road bridges in Florida
Bridges over the St. Johns River
Bridges on the Interstate Highway System
1989 establishments in Florida
Concrete bridges in the United States